Hipwood is a surname. Notable people with the surname include:

 Eric Hipwood (born 1997), Australian rules footballer
 James Hipwood (1842–1926), Australian politician
 Julian Hipwood (born 1946), British polo player and coach

See also
 Hopwood (surname)